Combat support agency (CSA)  is a designation by the United States Department of Defense (DoD) of those defense agencies that provide department-level and tactical support to the U.S. military during combat operations. The designation was first outlined by the Goldwater-Nichols Department of Defense Reorganization Act of 1986, with subsequent additions based on the department's needs. The designation includes several intelligence agencies under DoD, which have a national mandate in addition to their departmental combat support role.

Combat support agencies
Defense Contract Management Agency (DCMA)
Defense Health Agency (DHA)
Defense Information Systems Agency (DISA)
Defense Intelligence Agency (DIA)
Defense Logistics Agency (DLA)
Defense Threat Reduction Agency (DTRA)
National Geospatial-Intelligence Agency (NGA)
National Security Agency / Central Security Service (NSA/CSS)

References

Military terminology of the United States
United States Department of Defense agencies